The first season of the Canadian television comedy series Video on Trial premiered on MuchMusic on August 15, 2005 and concluded on August 6, 2006. It consists of 37 episodes.

Background
Video on Trial features music videos being humorously critiqued in a manner akin to a courtroom trial. The show's tongue-in-cheek manifesto, as announced in its original opening sequence, is seeing to it that "all music videos are brought to justice". A typical half-hour episode features five music videos being "tried" by a panel of five personalities acting as jurors.

Production
In this season, each episode commences with a roll call of the jury and a reading of the docket of accused music videos, with the remainder of the episode being dedicated to the trials for each video. The specific charges leveled at a video are announced at the beginning of its trial, and a final verdict for the artist of the video is presented at the conclusion of the episode. This general format would for the most part be followed by the series until midway through its fifth season.

An hour-long special entitled Stars on Trial aired on MuchMusic in December 2005, concurrently with Video on Trials first season. Following the same premise as Video on Trial, Stars on Trial featured celebrities being tried by various personalities who had previously appeared as jurors on Video on Trial.

Episodes

References

2005 Canadian television seasons
2006 Canadian television seasons